Dirk Cornelis de Hooch (1613–1651) was a 17th-century Dutch portrait painter, who lived and worked in The Hague (the Netherlands).

Born in 1613 at The Hague, he was a son of a Dutch bailiff, Cornelis de Hooch and his wife Jannetje Dirx van Doverschey. He was Gerrit de Hooch's uncle. He painted portraits and was a pupil of painter Pieter Quast. Dirk was a friend of Jan Jansz Buesem and Hans van Evelen (Ebeleyn), who both testified on his behalf in 1649. In 1645 he married Anna Heckselaer from Utrecht, widow of Pieter Hermensz Wolphes. Dirk Cornelisz murdered a fish seller called Stouthart in The Hague. Presumably for this reason, he fled to Königsberg (present-day Kaliningrad), but is mentioned again in The Hague in 1651 repeatedly harassing verbally a certain Magdaleentje Ariens Colijns.

References 
Haagse Schilders in de Gouden Eeuw, 1998 Uitgeverij Waanders, Zwolle.
Van Vader op Zoon, Vijf Eeuwen Kunstschilders, by J. Gestman Geradts, 2006, La Serre Studio.
De Nederlandsche Leeuw 1933.

1613 births
1651 deaths
Dutch Golden Age painters
Dutch male painters
Artists from The Hague